Two for one or 2 for 1 may refer to:

 Hendiadys, or "two for one", a figure of speech
 "Buy one, get one free", or "two for one", a type of sales promotion
 All at Once (2016 film) (working title Two for One), an American drama film
 Two 4 One, a 2014 Canadian comedy-drama film
 "Two for One" (Roseanne), a 1994 television episode
 Two for One: Wide Eyed/Brave, a 2008 double album by Nichole Nordeman
 "Two for one", in collectible card game strategy, a card advantage

See also
 Twofer, a cabling device used in theatrical stage lighting